No. 7 may refer to:
No. 7 Squadron IAF, an Indian Air Force unit
No. 7 Squadron RAAF, a Royal Australian Air Force unit
No. 7 (brand), a Boots UK own label
No.7-class minesweeper (1938)
, several ships